Cercospora hayi is a fungal plant pathogen. It can cause the brown spot disease in bananas.

References

External links

hayi
Fungal plant pathogens and diseases